Walter Smith III (born September 24, 1980) is an American jazz saxophonist and composer. He is the Chair of the Woodwind Department at the Berklee College of Music.

In addition to performing with his own group, Smith is a member of the Ambrose Akinmusire Quintet and Eric Harland's Voyager. He regularly plays and records with Taylor Eigsti, Christian Scott, Logan Richardson, Kendrick Scott, Aaron Parks, Warren Wolf, and others.

Biography
Smith began playing the saxophone at the age of seven in his hometown of Houston, Texas. His father was an elementary music teacher. His first gig was at a McDonald's. While at Houston's High School for the Performing and Visual Arts, he received a Clifford Brown/Stan Getz Fellowship from the International Association for Jazz Education (IAJE) and the National Foundation for Advancement in the Arts (NFAA); the NFAA Young Talent Award; a full-tuition scholarship to attend Berklee College of Music; and a United States Presidential Scholar in the Arts medal. He graduated from Berklee College of Music in 2003 with a Bachelor of Fine Arts degree in Music Education. He later earned a Graduate Diploma at the Thelonious Monk Institute of Jazz. Smith earned his Master of Music degree in Jazz Studies from Manhattan School of Music.

Smith has performed in numerous national and international festivals and on stages in the U.S. such as Carnegie Hall and the Kennedy Center. He has shared the stage and recorded with many jazz notables, including Terence Blanchard, Roy Haynes, Christian McBride, Eric Reed, Mulgrew Miller, Joe Lovano, Bob Hurst, Myron Walden, Walter Beasley, Lewis Nash, Terri Lyne Carrington, and others. To date, he has made more than 37 recordings.

Smith's debut recording as a leader was released in March 2006 on the Fresh Sound New Talent label and features Ambrose Akinmusire, Aaron Parks, Reuben Rogers, Eric Harland, and Kendrick Scott, and others. His sophomore release, entitled Live in Paris, was released in October 2009 featuring Ambrose Akinmusire, Aaron Goldberg, Matt Brewer, and Marcus Gilmore. His most recent album, III, was released in September 2010; It features Ambrose Akinmusire, Jason Moran, Joe Sanders, and Eric Harland. Smith is currently signed to Blue Note Records and is currently the chair of the woodwind department at the Berklee College of Music.

Discography

As leader
return to casual (2023) (Blue Note)
In Common III (with Matthew Stevens, Kris Davis, Dave Holland, Terri Lyne Carrington) (2022) (Whirlwind)
In Common 2 (with Matthew Stevens, Micah Thomas, Linda May Han Oh, Nate Smith) (2020) (Whirlwind)
In Common (with Matthew Stevens, Harish Ragavan, Marcus Gilmore, Joel Ross) (2018) (Whirlwind)
TWIO (with Harish Ragavan, Eric Harland, Joshua Redman, Christian McBride) (2018) (Whirlwind) 
Still Casual  (with Harish Ragavan, Kendrick Scott, Taylor Eigsti, Ambrose Akinmusire, Matthew Stevens) (2014) (Space Time) 
III (with Ambrose Akinmusire, Jason Moran, Joe Sanders, Eric Harland, Logan Richardson) (2010) (Criss Cross)
Bronze (with Alan Hampton, Bill Campbell, Mark Small) (2010) (Space Time)
Live In Paris (with Matt Brewer, Marcus Gilmore, Aaron Goldberg, Ambrose Akinmusire)( 2009) (Space Time) 
Casually Introducing (with Reuben Rogers, Vicente Archer, Eric Harland, Kendrick Scott, Robert Glasper, Lionel Loueke, Aaron Parks, Ambrose Akinmusire) (2006) (Fresh Sound)

With others
 Origami Harvest with Ambrose Akinmusire (2018)
 Reminiscent with Dayna Stephens (2015)
 Vipassana with Eric Harland (2014)
 When the Heart Emerges Glistening with Ambrose Akinmusire (2011)
 Voyager: Live by Night with Eric Harland (2010)
 Choices with Terence Blanchard (2009)
Live at Newport with Christian Scott (2008)
 Prelude... to Cora with Ambrose Akinmusire (2008)
The Source with Kendrick Scott Oracle (World Culture Music, 2007)
 Anthem with Christian Scott (2007)
 Rewind That with Christian Scott (2006)
Baker's Circle with Dave Stryker (2021)
  With love and sadness with  Matt Slocum  (2022)

References

1980 births
Living people
Musicians from Houston
American jazz saxophonists
American male saxophonists
High School for the Performing and Visual Arts alumni
21st-century American saxophonists
Jazz musicians from Texas
21st-century American male musicians
American male jazz musicians
Whirlwind Recordings artists